Takeoa is a genus of spiders in the family Zoropsidae. It was first described in 1967 by Lehtinen. , it contains 2 species, both found in Asia.

References

Zoropsidae
Araneomorphae genera
Spiders of Asia
Taxa named by Pekka T. Lehtinen